Horatio McCulloch  (November 1805 – 24 June 1867), sometimes written MacCulloch or M'Culloch, was a Scottish landscape painter.

Life
He was born in Glasgow in November 1805 the son of Alexander McCulloch, a cotton merchant, and his wife, Margaret Watson.

Horatio McCulloch was trained in the studio of the Glasgow landscape painter John Knox (1778–1845) for about one year alongside Daniel Macnee (1806–1882) and at first earned his living as a decorative painter. He was then engaged at Cumnock, painting the ornamental lids of snuffboxes, and afterwards employed in Edinburgh by William Home Lizars, the engraver, to colour the illustrations in Prideaux John Selby's British Birds and similar works.

After he moved to Edinburgh in 1825, he began painting in the tradition of Alexander Nasmyth. Working unweariedly from nature, he was greatly influenced in his early practice by the watercolours of H. V. Williams. He returned to Glasgow in 1827, and was employed on several large pictures for the decoration of a public hall in St. George's Place, and he did a little as a theatrical scene-painter. About this time by the writings of Sir Walter Scott and the expressive landscape works of John Thomson, friend of Scott's and minister at Duddingston Kirk, Edinburgh. Gradually MacCulloch asserted his individuality, and formed his own style on a close study of nature; his works form an interesting link between the old world of Scottish landscape and the new. 
 
In 1829 McCulloch first figured in the Royal Scottish Academy's exhibition. (He was a regular exhibitor year by year afterwards.)By the early 1830s McCulloch’s exhibits with the Glasgow Dilettanti Society and with the Royal Scottish Academy had begun to attract buyers, notably the newly instituted Association for the Promotion of the Fine Arts in Scotland. A commission from Lord Provost James Lumsden helped established the artist's reputation within Scotland. Commissions from book and print publishers allowed him to concentrate on easel painting.

On his election as full Academician of the Scottish Academy in 1838, McCulloch settled in Edinburgh and soon became a prominent figure in the artistic life of the capital and a prolific contributor to the Royal Scottish Academy exhibitions. At the same time contact with Glasgow was maintained: McCulloch’s favorite sketching grounds were in the west, he exhibited regularly in the city and his most loyal patrons were wealthy Glasgow industrialists such as David Hutcheson (1799–1881), the steamship owner. He seldom exhibited outside Scotland and only once at the Royal Academy, London (1843), but he kept in touch with London artist–friends, John Phillip, David Roberts and John Wilson (1774–1855), through correspondence and visits. His own art collection was evidence of his admiration for 17th-century Dutch painters, for J. M. W. Turner and Richard Wilson and for contemporaries such as Clarkson Stanfield.

McCulloch did not settle until he married. His first appearance in any Edinburgh Street Directory is in 1840 living at 12 Howard Place in the Inverleith district. In the 1841 he has left Edinburgh and is living at lodgings on Castle Street in Rothesay on the isle of Bute.

During one of his trips to Skye he met his future wife, Marcella McLellan of Gillean, near the township of Tarskavaig. It is known that he had several dogs of the Skye Terrier breed at his Edinburgh home and it is possible that he brought them from Skye with his wife.

McCulloch's pupils included John Smart R.S.A., now best known for his early etchings of golf courses in Scotland. Another was James Alfred Aitken.

McCulloch died at "St Colme" in Trinity, Edinburgh on 24 June 1867. He is buried at Warriston Cemetery in Edinburgh.
 His monument was carved by the Edinburgh sculptor, David Watson Stevenson.

Family

His widow Marcella McLellan, from Sleat on the Isle of Skye, left Scotland for Australia after his death, but died on the voyage.  They had no children.

In their early life they lived at 54 Inverleith Row.

From around 1855 they lived at 7 Danube Street, in the Stockbridge area of Edinburgh. His artist friend Kenneth Macleay lived nearby at 16 Carlton Street.

Works
During his lifetime Horatio McCulloch became the best-known and most successful landscape painter in Scotland. His constant aim was to paint the silence of the Highland wilderness where the wild deer roam with the kind of poetic truthfulness he admired in Wordsworth. The accomplished watercolours and broadly painted oil sketches that he produced throughout his career attracted little notice at the time and have remained comparatively unknown.

His early works include paintings of Cadzow Forest near Hamilton and grand views of the Clyde. He undertook regular summer sketching tours of the West Highlands, completing the sketches as paintings as back in his studio. These paintings celebrate the romantic scenery of the Highlands and evoke a magnificent sense of scale, emphasizing the dramatic grandeur. Horatio McCulloch had by his death in 1867 created the essential iconography of the Highlands.

From historical point of view, as the Scottish Lowlands became more urbanised, the distinctiveness of Scotland came to be represented through the Highlands. McCulloch's work was part of a process of distancing the relationship of people to land in the Highlands. In the Victorian period the Highlands to be defined as a wilderness instead of a populated space and many communities were cleared from the land in favor of large sheep farms and sporting interests. In essence, this romantic view of Scottish scenery was brought to a climax by Horatio McCulloch.

Several works by McCulloch were engraved by William Miller and William Forrest, and volume of photographs from his landscapes, with an excellent biographical notice of the artist by Alexander Fraser, R.S.A., was published in Edinburgh in 1872.

His best known works include:

 Inverlochy Castle (1857)
 Landscape  Evening (c1860)
 Glencoe, Argyllshire (1864)
 Loch Katrine (1866)

References

Sources
Sheena Smith (1988). Horatio McCulloch 1805-1867. Glasgow Museums and Art Galleries. 
Murdo MacDonald (2000). Scottish Art. Thames & Hudson, New York, NY, pp 104–106. 
Alexander Fraser (1872). The Life and Works of Horatio McCulloch.
John Morrison (2003). Painting the Nation: Identity and Nationalism in Scottish Painting, 1800-1920. Edinburgh University Press. 
David Irwin, Francina Irwin (1975). Scottish Painters: at Home and Abroad 1700-1900. Faber and Faber, London, pp 353–357

External links

 McCulloch Family Research
 Photo of Horatio MacCulloch
 Horatio McCulloch's works in National Galleries of Scotland
Exhibition at Tate, Highlands and Glens Land of the Mountain and the Flood 

Scottish landscape painters
Artists from Glasgow
1805 births
1867 deaths
Royal Scottish Academicians
Burials at Warriston Cemetery
19th-century British painters